Jo Copeland (1899– March 20, 1982) was an American fashion designer. She received the Neiman Marcus Fashion Award in 1944.

Early life and education
Copeland was born in New York City in 1899 to parents Samuel and Minna Copeland, however her mother died during childbirth. Copeland was educated in New York at Parsons School of Design and Art Students League of New York.

Career
After graduating from the Parsons School of Design, she began working as a designer which paid enough to help put her older brothers through Harvard Law School.  Copeland began selling her own designs as a commercial artist to manufacturing firms and was hired by Pattulo Models Inc in 1920 as a fashion illustrator.

After World War II led to the liberation of Paris, Copeland began looking at other sources of inspiration for fashion including China and South America. She also persuaded other American fashion designers to become independent from Paris' influence. Copeland was so determined to not be influenced by Paris that she refused to travel to the city after 1947. By 1949, she was promoted to partner at the firm Pattulo Models Inc and eventually became Vice-President and Head Designer at Pattulo-Jo Copeland Inc. where she earned a reputation for refusing to conform to typical fashion norms.

Copeland designed the buttoned, two-piece suit for women to wear without a blouse. She rejected the Mod style as desperation to be noticed and a sign of immaturity. As a result, many of her designs incorporated an extended torso and skirts no shorter than two inches above the knee. She received the 1944 Neiman Marcus Fashion Award for her designs.

Copeland died on March 20, 1982 from a stroke. A collection of her designs is on display at the Metropolitan Museum of Art.

References

1982 deaths
1899 births
American fashion designers
American Jews
Jewish women in business
Parsons School of Design alumni
20th-century American businesswomen
20th-century American businesspeople
American women fashion designers